Prostanthera caerulea, commonly known as lilac mint bush,  is a species of flowering plant that is endemic to  eastern Australia. It is an erect shrub with narrow egg-shaped leaves that have toothed edges, and white to bluish mauve flowers arranged on the ends of branchlets.

Description
Flowering occurs from September to November.

Taxonomy and naming
Prostanthera caerulea was first formally described in 1810 by Robert Brown in Prodromus Florae Novae Hollandiae et Insulae Van Diemen.

Distribution and habitat
Lilac mint bush grows in heath and forest on sandy soil from south-east Queensland to Wollongong in New South Wales.

References

caerulea
Flora of New South Wales
Flora of Queensland
Lamiales of Australia
Plants described in 1810
Taxa named by Robert Brown (botanist, born 1773)